Rincrew Abbey is a ruined abbey, traditionally associated with the Knights Templar, near Youghal in the south of Ireland. It is located in County Waterford.

History
Rincrew Abbey was built by the Knights Templar, later turned over to the Hospitallers Order of St John.

Location
The ruins of the abbey stand on a hill overlooking the River Blackwater north of Youghal. The ruins are situated on a private farm and have no public access.

See also
 List of abbeys and priories in Ireland (County Waterford)
 Molana Abbey
 Youghal Priory
 North Abbey, Youghal
 South Abbey, Youghal

References

External links
 Rincrew Religious House, Co. Waterford on Medieval News Blog

Knights Templar
Knights Hospitaller
Christian monasteries in the Republic of Ireland
Buildings and structures in Youghal
Religion in Youghal
Buildings and structures in County Waterford
Religion in County Waterford
Ruins in the Republic of Ireland